The climate of Nottingham features a temperate maritime climate (Köppen: Cfb) with relatively mild summers, cool winters and abundant rainfall throughout the year. Since 1960, rainfall and temperature records for the city have been kept at the Nottingham Weather Centre in Watnall. There is also another weather station operating at the University of Nottingham's agricultural campus in Sutton Bonington.

Classifications

Temperature
All averages and extremes are recorded at the Nottingham Weather Centre in Watnall.

Averages

Highest daily temperatures

Lowest daily temperatures

Daily record warm minima

Daily record cold maxima

Highest averages

Lowest averages

Precipitation

With its oceanic climate, Nottingham sees frequent precipitation all year round, with no wet or dry season. This is mainly in the form of rain with an average of  annually. By average volume, October is the wettest month, whilst February is the driest. Nottingham also sees snow, primarily during the winter, however heavy snow is rare.

Averages

Extremes

Lowest

Highest

Other phenomena

Sunshine, UV and daylight
Like most of the UK, Nottingham sees frequent overcast and cloudy skies due to the oceanic controlled climate and high latitude.

Wind

Station Data

Notes

References

Climate of England
Climate by city